Homogamy is marriage between individuals who are, in some culturally important way, similar to each other. It is a form of assortative mating. The union may be based on socioeconomic status, class, gender, caste, ethnicity, or religion, or age in the case of the so-called age homogamy.

It can also refer to the socialization customs of a particular group in that people who are similar tend to socialize with one another.

Criteria for mates

There are three criteria with which people evaluate potential mates: warmth and loyalty, attractiveness and vitality, and status and resources. These three categories can heavily shape themselves around the secondary traits of ethnicity, religion, and socio-economic status.

Ethnicity can be tied to perceptions of biological vitality and attractiveness. Socio-economic status relates directly to status and resources.  Religious or spiritual beliefs interpersonal behavior; people tend to be warmer and more trustworthy to those with similar beliefs.  Homogamy is an unsurprising phenomenon regarding people's liking and nurturing of others who are like them, may look like them, and act like them.

Homogamy is the broader precursor of endogamy, which encompasses homogamy in its definition but also includes an open refusal of others on the basis of conflicting traits, appearance, and fiscal worth. Homogamy is much less rigid in structure; a couple can belong to different denominations of Christianity but this will not be a point of contention in the relationship.

Religion

The integration of social science research and religion has given researchers a new insight into variables that affect marriage. Thomas and Cornwall (1990) state that the growing body of research is focused towards marital stratification and religiosity findings indicate that the ratio of higher religiosity with in marriage indicate a happier and stable partnership.

According to data collected from 700 couples in their first marriage and 300 couples in a remarriage of; religious and non-religious/ non-practicing, conclude the following. The majority of religious couples who attend their denominational/non-denominational church regularly experience a higher level of satisfaction in their martial relationship compared to non-practicing couples. Religious couples experience increased commitment and tend to be happier because of the stability and guide lines that religion poses on marriage. Findings in other areas of research also support that same-faith or inter-faith marriages tend to be stronger and more prosperous then non-religious marriages. According to Kalmijn (1998) there are three resources of culture to acknowledge.
 First, couples who share religious beliefs tend to communicate and interact more effectively based on doctrine, and may also positively reinforce and encourage each other.
 Second, opinions and values shared between spouses may lead to similar behaviour and perspective of the world.
 Third, religious views that are compatible may lead to joint exercises in both religious and nonreligious endeavours, this can only strengthen the relationship indefinitely.
Ellison and Curtis (2002) wrote that decisions on issues relating to family matters may result in greater consensus among couples who choose homogamy. Also, Church attendance provides a close network of support for couples. Marital separation between couples attending a denominational and non-denominational church is generally frowned upon and stigmatized.

Socioeconomic status

It is often seen that people choose to marry within their sociological group or with someone who is close to them in status. Characteristics such as ethnicity, race, religion, and socioeconomic status play a role in how someone chooses their spouse. Socioeconomic status can be defined as an individual's income, level of education, and occupation. Research on socioeconomic status of homogamy was developed by stratification researchers who used marriage patterns in conjunction with mobility patterns to describe how open stratification systems are. (Kalmijn, 2). Socioeconomic status can be divided into two studies: ascribed status and achieved status. Ascribed status simply means the occupational class of the father or father in law while achieved status is one's education and occupation. Ascribed status has become less important while achieved status and education have not lost their importance.

Most countries look at the educational status because it is easier for them judge the individual. The trends of socioeconomic homogamy are studied by the analysis of class, background and education. There has been a decline in a few industrialized countries regarding the importance of the social background for marriage choice; United States, Hungary, France and the Netherlands. (Kalmijn, 17). Today parents do not have any control over their children as the kids spend more time at college or university, increasing their social background. Education has become important for both the cultural taste and socioeconomic status. After education, falls the romantic consideration, when high standard of living is everyone's main goal.

Other uses

Homogamy has been suggested as a term for same-sex marriage or other union, and heterogamy as a term for marriage or a union between people of different sexes.

Same sex couples are more homophilic than straight sex couples. Same sex couples are more open-minded, democratic, and accepting of nontraditional relationships .  Same-sex couples are more likely to engage in relationships with different races or ethnicities.

Education plays an important role in a same sex relationship. This is because education level allows people to express themselves in society and stand for their rights. Couples who are in same sex relationships are more likely to live in urban areas than different sex couples. A study showed that same sex couples who are unmarried may have a different cohort. Couples who register their marriage with the state have a higher level of education than those who do not.  Since 1990-2000, same sex couples have not been reported as much different than straight sex couples in regards to relationship. Nevertheless, same-sex relationship, marriage or cohabitation has changed over time. The number of openly same-sex relationships has increased and same-sex relationships have become more accepted in Western societies. Same sex relationships can relate to homogamy, as many people may feel more comfortable being with someone of their same gender, who can relate to them easier. Therefore, same-sex relationships can fall under homogamy.

Causes

Many children are expected to marry people similar to or within their group. A small percentage of all marriages are inter-racial marriages (the opposite of homogamy). It often goes against the norm to marry a person outside one of the similar aspects of culture, race, background, religion, and class. These marriages have been said to attract attention and curiosity, along with many who disapprove this type of marriage.

Many people choose homogamy, and marry someone similar to their own group because of the similar life experiences they have been through. They may share some of the same opinions and views about specific things, and they have access to the same way of living. Another reason people often chose homogamy is because of geographic proximity. This basically means that people find partners who live in a close proximity to themselves. Since they are choosing partners that live close, this falls under homogamy, as they usually will share similar traits and characteristics, like social class, for example. It is common for people to choose homogamy, or fall into homogamy, because of a few important reasons. The first reason could be because of geographic segregation. Certain communities hold very strong ties that bring together their culture and feel obligated that they must stay within this community to hold these ties together and keep them strong. Another part of geographic segregation is discrimination; people feel as if they are not accepted and may be discriminated by people who are of different background than them.

Many social pressures encourage society to be with people who are similar to themselves and their family. The biggest pressure is from groups who want to keep their culture, background or ethnic identity. They feel as if an inter-racial marriage will lead to their culture heritage to change or start vanishing into the past. Groups such as the Arab, Asian and recently immigrated Hispanic, put great pressure on their culture to choose homogamy, because they want to keep and cherish their own unique culture for as long as they can. Another reason for homogamy is comfort level. It is common for people to feel more comfortable and at home with a partner and others of similar class, background, education or socio-economic status. It is common to see that partners in an inter-racial marriage tend to have trouble communicating which may lead to an uncomfortable relationship. Lastly, people of the same social groups share many similar experiences or memories that helps hold their cultural together and provides a more rewarding relationship of mutual understanding and comfort.

The German bundesbank published a study in 2018 which states that inheritance plays a bigger role than income.

See also
 Endogamy
 Hypergamy

References

External links
 Partner similarity and relationship satisfaction: development of a compatibility quotient. Glenn D. Wilson & Jon M. Cousins. Sexual and Relationship Therapy, Vol 18, No. 2, 2003.

Endogamy